Ayo Gorkhali: A History of the Gurkhas is a 2020 book by Nepalese author Tim Gurung. The book contains the history of Gurkhas. Ayo Gorkhali: A History of the Gurkhas received positive feedback from critics.

References

External links 

 Ayo Gorkhali: A History of the Gurkhas on Goodreads

2020 non-fiction books
21st-century Nepalese books
History books about Nepal
Nepalese non-fiction books
Westland Books books